Singing Battle is a 2016 South Korean television program hosted by Hyun Woo. It began to air on KBS2 every Fridays at 20:30 (KST) starting October 21, 2016. Season 1's last episode was broadcast on May 19, 2017.

Broadcast Information

Format
Main rule (not including pilot episodes and special episodes)

12 contestants (non-original singer) divided into 4 teams and performed one-on-one for each round. In the first round, the song will be randomly chosen and two first contestants decides to perform by press on the button. From round 2 to the end, the winning team of each round can choose the next team and contestant, but the contestant challenged will be prioritized to choose the song. The winners of each round are selected by 13 judges through instant live votes starting the last half of the song. The contestant who don't receive any vote of 7 first judges (K.O.) can be directly eliminated, no need to wait until the end of the song. The loser will be felled down a hole full of solid foam at the end of each performance. Each team has a hidden card, an original singer, and it will be used only one time follow the decision of the team leader. The hidden card just perform only one round and hold the fate, advance to the next round or be eliminated, of the principal contestant that they replace.

A new rule was introduced in 3rd Game (episodes 4–5), when all four teams have at least one loser, an only revival round will take place for only one loser of each team (mostly after the 5th or 6th round). Two songs will be randomly chosen for two pairs, the team which want to compete will push on the red button and the team leader will choose the competitor, then someone of each pair who win can return the main competition round.

Since episode 18, the K.O. rule was removed, the contestants' final result will be revealed at the end of each performance without exception.

Since episode 22, there was a special rule of MC: "If a team receives totally three yellow cards by MC (for example the team exceeded the time of consultation to select a song), and if they win in the final, their prize will be deprived."

Additional rules (changed in few episodes)

On the 6th Game (episodes 10–11), the team leader, who is an original singer, can play role as a hidden card and the others hidden cards will appear in their teams since the beginning. The rule of hidden card remain unchangeable.

Host
Namkoong Min (Pilot, Episodes 1–21)
Hyun Woo (Episodes 22–29)

Team leader

List of episodes and guests

Ratings
In the table below,  represent the lowest ratings and  represent the highest ratings.

2016

2017

Awards and nominations

International versions

Prior to its show's wide popular and success, they have their own its international versions:

 Currently airing
 Upcoming season
 Ceased to air

References

External links
 
 

2016 South Korean television series debuts
2017 South Korean television series endings
Korean-language television shows
Korean Broadcasting System original programming
South Korean variety television shows
South Korean music television shows